West Bengal Minority Minority Development Corporation (WBMDFC) is a government office to help backwards minority groups. It is controlled by the Government of West Bengal.

WBMDFC was established in 1996 as a result of the West Bengal Act XVIII of 1995 with the purpose of providing economic welfare, scholarships, vocational training, mass awareness and career counseling for religious minority groups (e.g. Muslims, Christians, Buddhists, Sikhs, Jains, Parsees, etc.).

Administrations

Chairman Dr. P. B. Salim, IAS

Managing Director Shri Mriganka Biswas, WBCS(Exe)

General Manager Md. Naqui, WBCS(Exe) & Md. Samsur Rahman, WBCS(Exe)

Scholarships

There are several scholarship that provides the minority students

Pre Matric,
Post Matric,
Merit-cum-Means,
Swami Vivekananda Merit-cum-Means,
State Govt. Sponsored Stipend Under Talent Support Programme (TSP)

References
wbmdfc.org

Government agencies of India